Pigeon Valley is a Natural Heritage Park and formally declared municipal nature reserve in Durban, South Africa (29.8646° S, 30.9869° E). It is an unusual example of an urban reserve with very high levels of biodiversity. It was established to provide protection for the Natal elm (Celtis mildbraedii) and other forest giants of the coastal climax forest. Another rare tree that occurs here is Natal forest loquat (Oxyanthus pyriformis), which is endemic to the Durban area and to oNgoye Forest. 

Pigeon Valley is about 11 ha in extent, and is situated on the Berea, overlooking Durban Bay. Its unusual north-south orientation may contribute to the biodiversity, with the south-facing slope covered in canopy forest, while the north-facing slope has thorny thickets. An adjoining reservoir, previously part of the reserve, provides a patch of coastal grassland.

Animals

The park is home to red duiker and blue duiker. Other mammals include Large-spotted Genet, a troop of banded mongooses as well as slender and water mongooses. Blue vervet monkeys are constantly present. In July 2019, a side-striped jackal was seen in neighbouring roads and was apparently living in the reserve for a time. This may be the southernmost sighting of this species.

Various species of forest birds are found here including; red-capped robin-chat, green twinspot, Cape white-eye, southern boubou, spotted ground thrush, purple-crested turaco and African paradise flycatcher. The black sparrowhawk breeds here annually. There are increasingly common visits by the Crowned Eagle, and it seems that two birds are now resident in the suburban area. Another bird that is seldom seen but that is generally present is buff-spotted flufftail. Unusual sightings of note in recent years include European nightjar, Knysna warbler, lemon dove, mountain wagtail, black-throated wattle-eye, common scimitarbill, palm-nut vulture  and Knysna turaco. The current bird list for Pigeon Valley includes 162 species.

The spotted ground thrush is of particular note, as Pigeon Valley is one of the places where this endangered bird can be most reliably found in winter. It arrives typically in late March or early April, and is present until August or September; earliest arrival date recorded has been 22 March and latest (in 2015) 5 October, apart from a single January sighting. Summer migrants include, occasionally, black cuckoo, red-chested cuckoo and red-backed shrike.

Bird list

Butterflies
The reserve is excellent for its butterflies, and the total listing is now 92 species. In September 2018 the first pupae of the short-barred sapphire were found on a Celtis mildbraedii tree. The host plant is the Oncocalyx quinquenervius mistletoe, which grows profusely on the tree. Subsequently a red-line sapphire was found at the same spot. The first forest queen was found in 2019.

Plants

There are over 110 species of trees occurring in Pigeon Valley, almost all of which are locally indigenous.  Pigeon Valley is also notable for large stands of buckweed (Isoglossa woodii), which grow in more open areas under the forest canopy and in forest glades. In recent years there have been a few discoveries of plants not previously identified.

Pigeon Valley is unique in having large numbers of the rare Natal elm, and of Natal forest loquat. A Cryptocarya specimen found adjacent to the main track has so far not been definitively identified; it may be a species seldom found in the area (C. liebertiana) or alternatively a hybrid (C. latifolia and C. woodii).

Public access
The reserve is open from 07:30 to 16:00 daily throughout the year.  The entrance is in Princess Alice Avenue, Glenwood, opposite Rhodes Avenue.

Community
An active grouping, Friends of Pigeon Valley, undertakes clearing of invasive alien plants, ensuring that the park is unusually free of alien species. It also liaises with management to ensure the biodiversity of the reserve and the wellbeing of visitors.  It also liaises with the municipal managers of the reserve to address relevant issues. The Friends operate a monthly walk open to the public on the second Saturday of each month, at 07h30. There is a Facebook page, Friends of Pigeon Valley, at https://www.facebook.com/FriendsOfPigeonValley/.

See also

 Forests of KwaZulu-Natal

References

Bibliography
 Pooley, T. and Player, I. (1995). KwaZulu-Natal Wildlife Destinations. .

Geography of KwaZulu-Natal
Nature reserves in South Africa